The delegations of Tunisia (mutamadiyah, plural mutamadiyat) are the second level administrative divisions of Tunisia between the governorates and the sectors (imadats).   there were 24 governorates which were divided into 264 delegations and further divided into 2073 sectors. The delegations are listed below, organized by governorate.

Ariana
Delegations of Ariana:
Ariana
Ettadhamen
Kalaat El Andalous
Mnihla
Raoued
Sidi Thabet
Soukra

Beja
Delegations of Beja:
Amdoun
Beja
Goubellat
Majaz al Bab
Nefza
Teboursouk
Testour
Thibar

Ben Arous
Delegations of Ben Arous:
Ben Arous
Bou Mhel el-Bassatine
El Mourouj
Ezzahra
Fouchana
Hammam Chott
Hammam Lif
Mohamedia
Medina Jedida
Megrine
Mornag
Rades

Bizerte
Delegations of Bizerte:
Bizerte
Djoumime
El Alia
Ghar El Melh
Ghezala
Mateur
Menzel Bourguiba
Menzel Jemil
Ras Jebel
Sejenane
Tinja
Utica
Zarzouna

Gabès
Delegations of Gabès:
Gabes
Ghannouch
Hamma
Mareth
Matmata
Menzel Habib
Metouia

Gafsa
Delegations of Gafsa:
Belkhir
Gafsa
Guetar
Ksar
Mdhila
Metlaoui
Oum Larais
Redeyef
Sened
Sidi Aich

Jendouba
Delegations of Jendouba:
Ain Draham
Balta
Bou Salem
Fernana
Ghardimaou
Jendouba
Oued Melliz
Tabarka

Kairouan
Delegations of Kairouan:
Alaâ
Bouhajla
Chebika
Echrarda
Haffouz
Hajeb El Ayoun
Kairouan
Nasrallah
Oueslatia
Sbikha

Kasserine
Delegations of Kasserine:
Ayoun
Ezzouhour
Feriana
Foussana
Hassi El Ferid
Hidra
Jedeliane
Kasserine
Magel Bel Abbes
Sbeitla
Sbiba
Thala

Kebili
Delegations of Kebili:
Douz North
Douz South
Faouar
Kebili North
Kebili South
Souk El Ahed

Kef
Delegations of Kef:
Dahmani
Es Sers
Jerissa
Kalaa Khasbat
Kalaat Senane
Kef East
Kef West
Ksour
Nebeur
Sakiet Sidi Youssef
Tajerouine

Mahdia
Delegations of Mahdia:
Boumerdes
Chebba
Chorbane
El Djem
Hbira
Ksour Essef
Mahdia
Melloulech
Ouled Chamekh
Sidi Alouane
Souassi

Manouba
Delegations of Manouba:
Borj El Amri
Douar Hicher
El Battan
Jedaida
Manouba
Mornaguia
Oued Ellil
Tebourba

Medenine
Delegations of Medenine:
Ben Gardane
Beni Khedache
Djerba Ajim
Djerba Midoun
Djerba Houmt Souk
Medenine North
Medenine South
Sidi Makhlouf
Zarzis

Monastir
Delegations of Monastir:
Bekalta
Bembla
Beni Hassen
Jammel
Ksar Hellal
Ksibet El Mediouni
Moknine
Monastir
Ouerdanine
Sahline
Sayada-Lamta-Bou Hjar
Teboulba
Zeramdine

Nabeul
Delegations of Nabeul:
Beni Khalled
Beni Khiar
Bou Argoub
Dar Chaabane El Fehri
El Mida
Grombalia
Hammam Ghezaz
Hammamet
Haouaria
Kelibia
Korba
Menzel Bouzelfa
Menzel Temime
Nabeul
Soliman
Takelsa

Sfax
Delegations of Sfax:
Agareb
Bir Ali Ben Khelifa
El Amra
El Ghraiba
Hencha
Jebeniana
Kerkennah
Mahres
Menzel Chaker
Sakiet Eddaier
Sakiet Ezzit
Sfax Medina
Sfax West
Sfax South
Skhira
Thyna

Sidi Bou Zid
Delegations of Sidi Bou Zid:
Bir El Hfay
Jelma
Mazzouna
Meknassi
Menzel Bouzaiene
Ouled Haffouz
Regueb
Sabalat Ouled Asker
Sidi Ali Ben Aoun
Sidi Bouzid East
Sidi Bouzid West
Souk Jedid

Siliana
Delegations of Siliana:
Bargou
Bouarada
El Aroussa
El Krib
Gaafour
Kesra
Makthar
Rouhia
Sidi Bourouis
Siliana North
Siliana South

Sousse
Delegations of Sousse:
Akouda
Bouficha
Enfidha
Hammam Sousse
Hergla
Kalaa Kebira
Kalaa Sghira
Kondar
M'Saken
Sidi Bou Ali
Sidi El Heni
Sousse Jaouhara
Sousse Medina
Sousse Riadh
Sousse Sidi Abdelhamid
Zaouiet Ksibet Thrayet

Tataouine
Delegations of Tataouine:
Bir Lahmar
Dhiba
Ghomrassen
Remada
Samar
Tataouine

Tozeur
Delegations of Tozeur:
Degueche
Hazoua
Nefta
Tamaghza
Tozeur

Tunis
Delegations of Tunis:
Bab Bhar
Bab Souika
Carthage
Cité El Khadra
Djebel Djelloud
El-Haraïria
El Kabaria
El Menzah
El Omrane
El Omrane Supérieur
El Ouardia
Ettahrir
Ezzouhour
La Goulette
La Marsa
Le Bardo
Le Kram
Medina
Sidi El Béchir
Sidi Hassine
Sijoumi

Zaghouan
Delegations of Zaghouan:
Bir Mchergua
Fahs
Nadhour
Saouaf
Zaghouan
Zriba

The delegations are further subdivided into municipalities (shaykhats).

References

See also
Governorates of Tunisia

 
Subdivisions of Tunisia
Tunisia, Delegations
Tunisia 2
Delegations, Tunisia